Always a Bridesmaid is a 1943 musical film starring The Andrews Sisters and Patric Knowles.

Plot
Three operators of a lonely hearts club are investigated by two detectives.

Production
Filming began 4 January 1943.

References

External links
 Always a Bridesmaid at IMDb
 Always a Bridesmaid at TCMDB

1943 films
American musical films
1943 musical films
American black-and-white films
Films directed by Erle C. Kenton
1940s American films